Thomas Patrick Gorman (June 9, 1886 – May 15, 1961), known as "T.P." or "Tommy", was a Canadian ice hockey executive, sports entrepreneur and athlete. Gorman was a founder of the National Hockey League (NHL), a winner of seven Stanley Cups as a general manager with four teams, and an Olympic gold medal-winning lacrosse player for Canada.

Early years
Gorman was born in Ottawa, Ontario. He was one of six children born to Thomas Patrick Gorman and Mary K Gorman (née MacDonald). He was a parliamentary page boy as a youth, but sports were his love. He was the youngest member of the Canadian lacrosse team that won the gold medal (only two teams competed) at the 1908 Summer Olympics. He then played professionally for a number of seasons. Gorman became a sports writer at the Ottawa Citizen, eventually becoming the sports editor. He worked at the newspaper until 1921.

Sports career
Even though he had never played hockey, Mr. Gorman was a talented evaluator of talent. Ted Dey, principal owner of the Ottawa Senators of the National Hockey Association, had trouble recruiting players for the 1916–17 season and hired Mr. Gorman to do the task. He did it so capably that he was hired as secretary-treasurer.

In November 1917, Gorman, George Kennedy, Sam Lichtenhein and Mike Quinn all played a part in suspending the NHA and forming the National Hockey League in an effort to rid themselves of Toronto NHA owner Eddie Livingstone. Gorman became the manager and part-owner of the Senators at that time. He helped lead the team to Stanley Cups in 1920, 1921, and 1923. He sold his interest in the Senators in 1925 to Frank Ahearn and became manager-coach of the New York Americans, introducing professional hockey to New York City.

He resigned from the Americans in 1929 to get involved in horse racing. He managed the Agua Caliente Racetrack in Mexico from 1929 until 1932. In 1932, Gorman brought the horse Phar Lap to Mexico where the horse won the $100,000 Agua Caliente Handicap before dying under mysterious circumstances in San Francisco. When the president of Agua Caliente sold the racetrack in 1932, Gorman was briefly out of sports.

Late in the 1932–33 season, he was hired as coach of the Chicago Black Hawks and became general manager as well the following season, building a defensive squad around Lionel Conacher and goalie Charlie Gardiner. He took the team from last place in their division in 1932–33 to their first Stanley Cup victory in 1934—despite scoring the fewest goals of any NHL team. Ten days after the Cup victory, Gorman resigned after a dispute with the owner. He went to Montreal as their manager-coach and helped the Montreal Maroons to their final Cup in 1935, thus becoming the first (and only) coach to win consecutive Stanley Cups with different teams. Gorman coached the Maroons until the club folded in 1938. In 1940, he became general manager of the Montreal Canadiens and led them to Cup victories in 1944 and 1946. He is the only person to manage four different teams to championships: the Senators, Black Hawks, Maroons and Canadiens. No other General Manager in the history of the NHL, Major League Baseball, the National Football League, or the National Basketball Association has won championships with four different teams.

Gorman was also a promoter. One of his flops was after he became manager-coach of the Montreal Maroons when he booked evangelist Aimee Semple McPherson at the Montreal Forum. Few people came. "No one wanted to be saved," he explained. However, some of his better promotions came when he was the Montreal Canadiens general manager. He had Duke Ellington and Frank Sinatra perform at the Forum.

After retiring as general manager of the Canadiens in 1946, Gorman bought the Ottawa Senators of the Quebec Senior Hockey League, managing it to win the Allan Cup in 1949. He took figure skater Barbara Ann Scott on a continental tour after she won the figure skating gold medal at the 1948 Winter Olympics. Gorman revived professional wrestling in Montreal and promoted it in Ottawa, and introduced professional baseball to Ottawa in 1951 with the Ottawa Giants of the International League.

In 1937, he took over management of the Connaught Park Racetrack, a horse race track in Aylmer QC, near Ottawa, of which he had been a part-owner since 1925. Gorman was managing the race track when he died of cancer at a hospital in Ottawa at the age of 74. He was the last living founder of the NHL. He has been inducted into the Hockey Hall of Fame (1963), the Ottawa Sports Hall of Fame (1966), and the Canadian Horse Racing Hall of Fame (1977).

Coaching record

Family
Gorman was married in 1910 to Mary Westwick, sister of Rat Westwick, one of the "Silver Seven", and was an uncle to Bill Westwick. They had four children, Mary Kathleen, Dorothy Elizabeth (Betty), Lawrence Franklyn (Frank) and Joseph (Joe). Mary Kathleen, born in 1911, died at two weeks of age. Betty, born in 1919, married Allan Hern, son of goaltender Riley Hern of the Montreal Wanderers. Betty Hern-Gorman and Al Hern had four children, Riley, Diana, Peter and Timothy. Betty died in 2001.

While Gorman was with the Montreal Canadiens, Joe was his assistant. After Gorman returned to Ottawa, T.P., Frank and Joe worked together to operate the Ottawa Auditorium and Connaught Park. After Gorman's death from cancer in 1961, Frank and Joe continued to operate the Auditorium until its demolition in 1967 and Connaught until 1984 when Frank died. The track was sold to Joe in 1986 who operated it on his own, until it eventually went bankrupt in 1995. Joe died in 2007.

References

External links
 
 T.P. (Tommy) Gorman at the Canadian Horse Racing Hall of Fame

1886 births
1961 deaths
Businesspeople from Ottawa
Canadian lacrosse players
Canadian ice hockey owners
Chicago Blackhawks coaches
Hockey Hall of Fame inductees
Ice hockey people from Ottawa
Lacrosse players at the 1908 Summer Olympics
Medalists at the 1908 Summer Olympics
Montreal Canadiens executives
Montreal Maroons
National Hockey League executives
New York Americans coaches
Olympic gold medalists for Canada
Olympic lacrosse players of Canada
Olympic medalists in lacrosse
Ottawa Senators (original) personnel
Stanley Cup champions
Stanley Cup championship-winning head coaches
Westwick family